The Best of Disney Channel is best-of compilation album released on March 26, 2007. featuring 16 tracks from Disney Channel films and television series. A DVD is also included with selected music videos of songs from the accompanying CD.

Track listing

CD
 "Breaking Free" - (High School Musical) - Troy & Gabriella
 "Best of Both Worlds" - (Hannah Montana) - Miley Cyrus as Hannah Montana
 "The Party's Just Begun" - (The Cheetah Girls 2) - The Cheetah Girls
 "Push It to the Limit" - (Jump In!) - Corbin Bleu
 "I Can't Wait" - (Lizzie McGuire) - Hilary Duff
 "Supernatural" - (That's So Raven) - Raven-Symoné
 "Get Your Shine On" - (Kim Possible: So the Drama) - Jesse McCartney
 "Outside Looking In" - (Read it and Weep) - Jordan Pruitt
 "My Hero Is You" - (Tiger Cruise) - Hayden Panettiere
 "Over It" - (Stuck in the Suburbs) - Anneliese van der Pol
 "On the Ride" - (Cow Belles) - Aly & AJ
 "Go Figure" - (Go Figure) - Everlife
 "Say the Word" - (Kim Possible) - Christy Carlson Romano
 "Strange World" - (Halloweentown High) - Jessie Payo
 "The Other Side of Me" Remix - (Hannah Montana) - Miley Cyrus as Hannah Montana
 "We're All in This Together" Remix - (High School Musical) - Cast of High School Musical
 "The concept of love" - (Bomb Rush Cyberfunk) - (Hideki Naganuma)

DVD
"Breaking Free" - Troy & Gabriella
"Best of Both Worlds" - Hannah Montana
"The Party's Just Begun" - The Cheetah Girls
"Push It to the Limit" - Corbin Bleu
"Supernatural" - Raven-Symoné
"Outside Looking In" - Jordan Pruitt
"Get Your Shine On" - Jesse McCartney
"On the Ride" - Aly & AJ

References

Walt Disney Records compilation albums
Disney Channel albums
Television soundtracks
2007 compilation albums
2007 video albums
Music video compilation albums